"Pas vu pas pris" is a song by French model, actress and singer Corynne Charby from her 1987 album Toi. It was also released as a single.

The single debuted at number 50 in France for the week of 12 December 1987, peaking at number 39 six weeks later.

Composition 
The song was written and produced by Franck Yvy and Jean-Louis D'Onorio.

Track listing 
7" single (Polydor 887 156-7)
 "Pas vu pas pris" (3:40)
 "Quelques notes de musique" (3:30)

Charts

References

External links 
 

Corynne Charby songs
1987 songs
1987 singles
Polydor Records singles